An Olympic Village is an accommodation center built for the Olympic Games, usually within an Olympic Park or elsewhere in a host city. Olympic Villages are built to house all participating athletes, as well as officials and athletic trainers. After the Munich Massacre at the 1972 Olympics, the Villages have been made extremely secure. Only athletes, trainers and officials are allowed to room at the Village, though family members and former Olympic athletes are allowed inside with proper checks. Press and media are also barred.

History

The idea of the Olympic Village comes from Pierre de Coubertin. Up until the 1924 Summer Olympic Games, National Olympic Committees rented locations around the host city to house participants, which was expensive. For the 1924 Summer Olympics, the organizers built cabins near the Stade Olympique de Colombes to allow the athletes to easily access the Games' venues. The Olympic Village of the 1932 Summer Olympics in Los Angeles served as the model of today's Olympic Villages; it consisted of a group of buildings with rooms to lodge athletes, and buildings with other accommodations.

List of Olympic Villages
 Athens 1906 (Intercalated Games): The Zappeion, which was used during Athens 1896 as the main Fencing Hall, was used in 1906 as a (not purpose-built) Olympic Village.
 Paris 1924: In Paris in 1924, a number of cabins were built near the stadium to house visiting athletes; the complex was called "Olympic Village".
 Los Angeles 1932: An Olympic Village was built for the first time in Baldwin Hills, occupied by male athletes. It consisted of several hundred buildings, including post and telegraph offices, an amphitheater, a hospital, a fire department, and a bank. Female athletes were housed at the Chapman Park Hotel on Wilshire Boulevard.

 Berlin 1936: About 145 one- and two-story apartment buildings, Haus der Nationen refectory, Hindenburghaus theater, a hospital, an indoor arena, a swimming pool and a sauna in Wustermark about 9.5 kilometres west of Berlin. Used as barracks for over 50 years, the buildings are partially ruined. A men's residence has been restored under the name "Jesse Owens house".
 Helsinki 1952: The first Olympic Village, Olympiakylä, was constructed in the Käpylä district of Helsinki for the planned 1940 Summer Olympics, which were cancelled due to World War II. Another Olympic Village, Kisakylä, was built nearby for the 1952 Olympics. Kisakylä couldn't accommodate all athletes so other villages were also designated for instance in Otaniemi and the Santahamina military base. Both Olympiakylä and Kisakylä areas are listed by Docomomo as significant examples of modern architecture in Finland.

 Melbourne 1956: The area in Heidelberg West, Victoria, where the athletes stayed is still called "Olympic Village". After the games, athlete residences were used for public housing. The area now consists of a sports center, a primary school, shopping strip, a community health centre which also houses a registered training organization and a legal service. 
 Squaw Valley 1960: Four identical three-story apartment buildings, two of which still stand, modified into condominiums.
 Rome 1960: consist of 33 buildings with two, three, four and even five floors.
 Tokyo 1964: Main village in Yoyoki, with 4 other satellite village in Tokyo. 
 Mexico City 1968: 904 apartments distributed in 29 multi-story buildings in the Miguel Hidalgo Olympic Village Complex.
 Munich 1972: Multiple buildings of 25, 22, 20, 19, 16, 15, and 12 stories, used now as Olympic Village student housing.

 Montreal 1976: Olympic Village (Montreal), Two 23-story pyramid-shaped buildings. Now apartment buildings.
 Lake Placid 1980: Later converted into a Federal Prison FCI Ray Brook.
 Moscow 1980: Eighteen 16-story buildings.
 Sarajevo 1984: Apartment buildings now used as condominiums and tourist facilities.
 Los Angeles 1984: The UCLA residents' facilities, CSULA, USC, and UCSB.
 Calgary 1988: Presently student accommodations on the campus of the University of Calgary. The athlete's village consisted of the existing Kananaskis, Rundle, Castle, Norquay and Brewster buildings, as well as the newly constructed Glacier and Olympus buildings.
 Seoul 1988: Twenty-one multiple-story buildings located in Jamsil. 
 Albertville 1992: Brides-les-Bains
 Barcelona 1992: A new neighbourhood, La Vila Olímpica, was built on reclaimed sea front in Poblenou; it became residential after the Games. Secondary villages were built in Banyoles and La Seu d'Urgell for rowing and white water canoeing athletes respectively.
Lillehammer 1994: The village was built on a west-facing slope just to the north of Lillehammer, and took its form from the old farms of Gudbrandsdal.
 Atlanta 1996: Housing was built on the campus of Georgia Institute of Technology, Clark Atlanta University, and Georgia State University. The Olympic village at Georgia State was later bought by Georgia Tech for students' housing. The village on the campus of Clark Atlanta, later became housing for students at CAU.
 Nagano 1998: The village is located 7 kilometers southwest of Nagano Station. The total land space is 19 hectares. There are 1032 apartments in 22 buildings, and is capable of accommodating 3,000 people. Another Village was in Karuizawa, the site for the newly entered Olympic sport of curling. Karuizawa is about 70 kilometers southeast of Nagano City. 120 people from 9 countries stayed at the Karuizawa Skate Center Hotel during the Winter Games.
 Sydney 2000: A new suburb, Newington, which became residential following the Games.

 Salt Lake City 2002: Housing from the University of Utah and Fort Douglas (located on the campus).
 Athens 2004: A new suburb composed of four- to five-story apartments in the Parnitha area located in northeast Athens adjacent to Maroussi, the suburb where the main Olympic complex, OAKA, is located. The Athens Olympic Village also became a residential area following the Games. Today, the village with a capacity of approximately 10,000 people is in use.
 Turin 2006: The Olympic Village was located in the city of Turin and in the towns of Bardonecchia and Sestriere.
 Beijing 2008: Beijing Olympic Village Twenty-two 6-story buildings and twenty 9-story buildings (for Beijing Venue); Royal Park Hotel (for Hong Kong venue).
 Vancouver 2010: Vancouver Olympic Village and Whistler Olympic and Paralympic Village
 Singapore 2010 (Youth): Campus of the Nanyang Technological University

 London 2012: A new district of London called East Village

 Sochi 2014: Coastal Olympic Village and Mountain Olympic Village
 Lillehammer 2016 (Youth): Two villages, one in Lillehammer (Birkebeineren Hotel & Apartments plus new residential buildings) and one in Hamar (the 239-room Hotel Scandic Hamar).
 Rio de Janeiro 2016: Located in Barra da Tijuca, close to City of Sports Complex.
 Pyeongchang 2018: Pyeongchang Olympic Village
 Buenos Aires 2018 (Youth): Youth Olympic Village (Buenos Aires), 1440 new apartments on seven-story buildings in the district of Villa Soldati, within the limits of the City Park.

 Lausanne 2020 (Youth): The Youth Olympic Village (Lausanne), 952 rooms, 9 floors. Became student apartments.
 Tokyo 2020: Located in Harumi, an island district of Chūō, Tokyo (central Tokyo).  The Harumi Futo village will have 21 residential buildings with over 5000 units.  There are also two satellite villages, for cycling and sailing.  
 Beijing 2022: Located in Beijing's  Chaoyang and Yanqing districts; co-host city Zhangjiakou,
This allows 85% of athletes to be 30 minutes from their competition venues.  
 Milan-Cortina 2026:
 Los Angeles 2028: UCLA Campus
 Brisbane 2032: Northshore Hamilton

References

External links

1932 introductions
Olympic Parks